David Dennis (born 1980) is an Australian rower who represented Australia at the 2004 Summer Olympics in the men's coxless four  and Australia at the 2008 Summer Olympics in the men's eight.

References 

1980 births
Olympic rowers of Australia
Living people
Rowers at the 2004 Summer Olympics
Rowers at the 2008 Summer Olympics
Australian male rowers
21st-century Australian people